{{Infobox musical artist 
| name             = Orange Juice
| image            = 
| caption          = 
| image_size       = 
| background       = group_or_band
| alias            = 
| occupation       = 
| origin           = Bearsden, Scotland, United Kingdom
| genre            = {{hlist|Post-punk|new wave|jangle pop<ref name="Now That's What I Call New Pop!">Harvel, Jess. "Now That's What I Call New Pop!". Pitchfork Media. 12 September 2005.</ref>|indie pop}}
| years_active     = 1979–1985, 2008
| label            = Postcard, Polydor, Domino
| associated_acts  = 
| website          = 
| current_members  = 
| past_members     = Edwyn CollinsJames KirkDavid McClymontSteven Daly Chris Gordon Malcolm RossZeke ManyikaClare KennyJohnny Britten Paul Heard Steve Skinner
}}

Orange Juice was a Scottish jangle pop band founded in the Glasgow suburb of Bearsden as the Nu-Sonics in 1976. They became Orange Juice in 1979, and became perhaps the most important band in the Scottish independent music scene that emerged in the post-punk era, inspired by contemporary punk bands including Subway Sect, Television, and Buzzcocks but also 1960s acts, most notably The Byrds and The Velvet Underground. Musically, the band brought together styles and genres that often appeared incongruous, for example, country, disco and punk.

The band released their first singles during 1980 and 1981 on the independent Postcard Records label founded by Alan Horne, along with fellow Scottish bands Josef K and Aztec Camera. Orange Juice's 'neo acoustic', jangly guitar sound – as evident in singles including "Blue Boy" and "Simply Thrilled Honey" – came to define 'The Postcard Sound' that directly influenced acts as diverse as The Bluebells, Haircut One Hundred and The Smiths.

Despite their association with the independent scene, the band signed to the major label Polydor Records in 1981 and recorded their first album, You Can't Hide Your Love Forever for them. However, internal tensions led to splits in the band in late 1981, with their second album, released in late 1982, showing more pop sensibilities and combining their guitar-based sound with disco influences. The band's only Top 40 hit, "Rip It Up" was achieved with the aid of the synthesizer – it was the first hit to use the Roland TB-303.  "Rip It Up", reached number 8 on the UK Singles Chart in February 1983. Subsequent singles failed to chart as highly, but the band continued to be critically acclaimed, finally splitting up in January 1985 after a gig for the UK miners' strike. Their three albums have been subsequently reissued and remastered on several occasions, with a major career-spanning box set Coals to Newcastle released in 2010.

Edwyn Collins pursued a successful solo career following the band's split, whilst other members James Kirk, David McClymont, Malcolm Ross and Zeke Manyika have had lower-profile solo releases. The original line-up of the band reunited once in 2008 to be honoured for their influence on Scottish music, but the band has never reformed.

History
Origins: The Nu Sonics
Orange Juice had their origin in the Nu Sonics, formed by Edwyn Collins with college friend Alan Duncan (on bass) in 1976: the band was named after the affordable Burns nu-sonic guitar used by Collins. Two students in the year below them – Steven Daly and James Kirk, previously in punk band, The Machetes – were drafted into the band in 1977, with a fifth member, Geoff Taylor, playing drums. A first gig was held in the Silver Thread in Paisley in November 1977, with Daly on lead vocals. Daly subsequently shifted to drums, and further local gigs followed as a four-piece, including one supporting Steel Pulse at Satellite City in January 1978, alongside Johnny and the Self-Abusers, later to be known as Simple Minds. Duncan left the band after a gig at Hardgate Town Hall, leaving the remaining members to search for a new bass player.

The Postcard years

Shortly after Duncan's departure, one of Collins' colleagues in the Glasgow Parks Department, David McClymont, joined the band on bass, and the band was rechristened as Orange Juice. Collins, Kirk, McLymont and Daly's first gig as Orange Juice occurred in April 1979 in the Glasgow School of Art refectory. At another early gig at Teviot Row House at the University of Edinburgh was recorded by Malcolm Ross of Josef K, and one track from this (Kirk's "Felicity") was pressed as a flexi-disc to be distributed with a planned fanzine to be called '''Strawberry Switchblade', a name that later inspired and was adopted for a band formed by friends of the group and notably Alan Horne, the manager of Postcard Records. Horne planned the fanzine with Collins in 1979 primarily as a conduit to release Orange Juice's music. The fanzine never appeared, though some copies of the flexi were given away in the Ten Commandments fanzine run by Robert Hodgens (of The Bluebells).

Daly left shortly after the Teviot Row gig, joining local punk act Fun 4. Daly was replaced in Orange Juice by Chris Gordon on drums, but was persuaded back to record the band's debut single "Falling and Laughing" for Postcard after Gordon suffered from stage fright at a number of gigs. The debut single was recorded in December 1979 in Strathaven, with Malcolm Ross co-producing and adding guitar to both the A-side and the playful and instrumental B-side "Moscow", the latter recorded as a tentative 'theme tune' for the coming 1980 Moscow Olympics. Fewer than 1,000 copies of "Falling and Laughing" were pressed, and most included copies of the "Felicity" flexi: 200 also included a postcard of the band. The wrap-round cover and amateur packaging established Postcard's home-spun aesthetic, with the label's "Sound of Young Scotland" tagline marking it out as something of a reaction to much of the seriousness and angst of post-punk. Released in February 1980, "Falling and Laughing" was Postcard's signature tune: lyrically and musically, it celebrated the innocence of youth and was very much at odds with much contemporary independent music, combining a disco bass-line purloined from an ELO song with jangly guitars reminiscent of the Velvet Underground.

"Falling and Laughing" immediately marked out Postcard Records as a label to watch, and subsequent releases by Josef K and Aztec Camera consolidated its reputation as being at the cutting-edge of a new wave of Scottish pop. But it was Orange Juice that came to embody the "Sound of Young Scotland", with Collins' on-stage behaviour, charity-shop chic and occasional self-parody combining camp aesthetics with a subversive rejection of macho rock and roll cliché. Live, performances could be shambolic, with guitars often out of tune, and songs often aborted as drums, bass and guitar raced away from each other. Occasionally, crowds were hostile towards the band, seeing them as effeminate and anti-rock. Nonetheless, gigs in Glasgow and then Edinburgh began to attract a sizable fan-base: notable gigs with Josef K were sold as 'Postcard' nights, including the infamous 'Funky Glasgow Now' show at Glasgow Technical College in April 1980.

The band's debut single was followed by a series of well-received Postcard 7" releases: "Blue Boy", "Simply Thrilled Honey" and "Poor Old" Soul in 1980 and 1981. Selling sufficiently to appear prominently in the independent charts, these garnered considerable interest from the London-based music press, much of which appeared charmed by the band's on-stage antics. Invitations to record two sessions for Radio One DJ's John Peel followed, and, in the autumn of 1980, the band was invited on a national tour by Peel-favourites The Undertones, gaining further exposure. One of these gigs was at Rock City in Nottingham: coming on as support band, Orange Juice became the first band to play this now-legendary venue (on 11 Dec 1980).

Demos for an album on Postcard were completed in a single day at Hellfire Studios in Glasgow in 1981, with the working title Ostrich Churchyard. Seeking better distribution to get the debut album to a larger audience, Postcard approached Rough Trade Records with these demos, with Rough Trade agreeing to fund recording sessions in London in the summer of 1981, promising to distribute the debut album whilst allowing Postcard to retain artistic freedom. The album was recorded in Regent's Park Studios in London in August 1981, under the auspices of Scritti Politti producer Alan Kidron, who sought to augment the band's guitar-based sound with backing singers, horns and keyboards, emulating the sound that had made Scritti's "The "Sweetest Girl"" a modest crossover hit. Afterwards, Orange Juice took the tapes from these sessions and signed to Polydor, hastening the demise of Postcard (with a scheduled fifth Orange Juice single on Postcard, "Wan Light", failing to ever see the light of day). The Postcard Records-era history of Orange Juice is featured in the 2015 documentary film Big Gold Dream.

Debut album
Debut album You Can't Hide Your Love Forever was not released until February 1982, and received mixed reviews, with the use of backing singers and synthesizers anathema to some of the band's long-term fans. Retrospectively, however, the album is often cited as a classic of the era and a key influence on the C86 generation and beyond. By the stage the album was released, the band in any case had a new line-up: in August 1981, Josef K split up, with Collins asking guitarist Malcolm Ross to join the band, making it a five-piece. This caused some ructions, with Daly and Kirk reportedly feeling the band was losing its original sound (Daly in particularly having publicly objected to the first Polydor single "L.O.V.E... Love", a cover of the Al Green classic, released in October 1981). Collins was reported in the press as siding with Kirk and Daly before deciding to leave with Malcolm Ross and bass player David McLymont. Collins, Ross and McLymont performed as a three-piece, with stand-in drummers, on a couple of Autumn 1981 gigs before Zeke Manyika made his live debut in January 1982 at the London Venue. As such, the line-up that promoted You Can't Hide Your Love Forever on tour in early 1982 was not the line-up that recorded it: ignoring older material penned by James Kirk (e.g. "Felicity", "Wan Light", "You Old Eccentric", "Three Cheers for Out Side") the band often used dates to debut new songs that overtly more pop in style, including a cover of The Staple Singers' "I'll Take You There", future single "I Can't Help Myself" (with its telling reference to The Four Tops), and "In Spite of It All", later renamed and issued as the single "Two Hearts Together" in the summer of 1982. The latter single was released as a double A-side with "Hokoyo", a song co-written by Zeke Manyika and featuring lyrics in Shona, showing the band moving away from its original guitar-based sound and towards a more varied and eclectic musical palette.

Rip It Up and chart success
Despite increasing exposure on TV and media, both of Orange Juice's 1982 singles failed to deliver the anticipated hit. However. the album Rip It Up issued in November 1982 was to spawn the eponymous single "Rip It Up", which reached number 8 on the UK Singles Chart in February 1983. Referencing both Chic and the Buzzcocks, the single cemented Orange Juice as one of the brightest bands in the 'new pop' scene. The single was promoted through two memorable Top of the Pops performances, including one where bass player David McLymont appeared to fall into the crowd, apparently inebriated, gaining them a ban from the programme. DJ Janice Long championed the band, commissioning two further Radio One Sessions in March 1983 (neither commercially released, and assumed missing from the BBC archive), while magazines including Smash Hits continued to showcase the band (its editor Ian Cranna becoming the band's manager). However, the follow-up single to "Rip It Up", "Flesh of My Flesh", failed to build on its success, peaking at number 41 in the spring of 1983.

Later years
New single "Place in my Heart" was scheduled for October 1983 as a teaser for an album that would come out the following month. However, both were pulled following Ross and McClymont leaving the group, citing 'musical differences': the last appearance of the four-piece Orange Juice was their open-air festival appearance at Victoria Park, Hackney 6 Aug 1984. Salvaged from the album sessions, the six-track mini-album Texas Fever, issued in March 1984, was critically feted, but failed to spawn a hit with its only single, "Bridge".

From this point Orange Juice had a core line-up of Collins and Manyika, who proceeded to record Orange Juice's final album, The Orange Juice, with Clare Kenny on bass, and with Johnny Britten on guitar and Paul Herd on bass joining the live set-up. Produced by Dennis Bovell, the album was named with reference to the third album by The Velvet Underground. Again critically acclaimed, the album's blue-eyed soul influences presaged other 1980s Scottish acts taking inspiration from this genre, including Wet Wet Wet and Hue and Cry. The album's lead single "What Presence?!" was notable for a video by Derek Jarman but also failed to break into the top 40, peaking at 47, while prophetic single "Lean Period" just crept into the top 75. The album was promoted via 'The Artisans' tour in the Autumn of 1984, with Steve Skinner replacing Britten on guitar, but by this stage venues and crowds were becoming smaller (and a final London Lyceum date in December 1984 was cancelled because of poor sales). Relations with Polydor became strained by the fact Orange Juice could not tour internationally because of Zeke Manyika's immigration status, with the release of a third single from the album vetoed as the record label focused on other acts, to Collins' vocal disapproval. At the same time, Collins' decision to release material with former schoolfriend Paul Quinn on Alan Horne's new Swampland Records label further soured the relationship with Polydor.

The band's final show was in January 1985 at a gig for the UK miners' strike, where they came on as the first act (before Aztec Camera and Everything but the Girl), announcing it was their last gig to a half-empty venue. Their final song was "Rock and Roll (I Gave You the Best Years of My Life)", a cover of a Kevin Johnson song. Following the split, Manyika recorded a solo album for Polydor, who also released an Orange Juice 'greatest hits' album In a Nutshell in 1985, while Collins signed for Creation Records the same year, with his solo debut single "Don't Shilly Shally" released on the Creation-offshoot Elevation Records in 1986.

Legacy

While never enjoying prolonged commercial success, Orange Juice were to exercise considerable influence over the indie pop and indie rock scenes that followed in the UK. Most notably, commentators often noted the debt that The Smiths owed to Collins' lyrics, while a number of other later 1980s bands were to cite Orange Juice and other Postcard Records acts as an influence, with the C86 scene featuring numerous acts who either covered Orange Juice songs (e.g. The Wedding Present) or who borrowed elements of their sound (e.g. Mighty Mighty, The Chesterf!elds, The June Brides, The Bodines). Internationally, Orange Juice also inspired the neo-acoustic movement in Japan, with the band Flipper's Guitar naming their 1989 debut album after one of James Kirk's compositions, "Three Cheers for Our Side".

In the 1990s, the rejuvenated Postcard Records issued a collection of the band's early singles and in 1993 finally released the demos for the first album Ostrich Churchyard alongside a reissue of "Blue Boy", while Polydor collected the best of their major releases on a new 'best of' compilation, The Esteemed – The Very Best of Orange Juice.

In the 2000s, guitar bands including Franz Ferdinand, Hatcham Social, The Drums, and The Cribs proclaimed Orange Juice as an influence, triggering renewed interest in the band. Franz Ferdinand's label, the Domino Recording Company, responded by issuing re-releases of all four Polydor albums on vinyl and CD, with a major 6 CD/DVD collection Coals to Newcastle released in 2010.

Edwyn Collins continues to perform Orange Juice songs at his live shows. Though Malcolm Ross was initially part of Collins' live band, and Kirk, Manyika, and McLymont continue to record and perform intermittently, the band has never reformed. To date, the original line-up of the band has reunited publicly just once, in 2008, when they were honoured for their influence on Scottish music by the Nordoff Robbins musical trust.

Discography

You Can't Hide Your Love Forever (1982)
Rip It Up (1982)
The Orange Juice (1984)

References

External links
 
 
 
 

Scottish post-punk music groups
Scottish new wave musical groups
Jangle pop groups
Musical groups from Glasgow
British indie pop groups